In plasma physics, magnetic helicity is a measure of the linkage, twist, and writhe of a magnetic field. In ideal magnetohydrodynamics, magnetic helicity is conserved. When a magnetic field contains magnetic helicity, it tends to form large-scale structures from small-scale ones. This process can be referred as an inverse transfer in Fourier space.

This second property makes magnetic helicity special: three-dimensional turbulent flows tend to "destroy" structure, in the sense that large-scale vortices break-up in smaller and smaller ones (a process called "direct energy cascade", described by Lewis Fry Richardson and Andrey Nikolaevich Kolmogorov). At the smallest scales, the vortices are dissipated in heat through viscous effects. Through a sort of "inverse cascade of magnetic helicity", the opposite happens: small helical structures (with a non-zero magnetic helicity) lead to the formation of large-scale magnetic fields. This is for example visible in the heliospheric current sheet – a large magnetic structure in the Solar System.

Magnetic helicity is of great relevance in several astrophysical systems, where the resistivity is typically very low, so that magnetic helicity is conserved to a very good approximation. For example: magnetic helicity dynamics are important in solar flares and coronal mass ejections. Magnetic helicity is present in the solar wind. Its conservation is significant in dynamo processes. It also plays a role in fusion research, for example in reversed field pinch experiments.

Mathematical definition 
Generally, the helicity  of a smooth vector field  confined to a volume  is the standard measure of the extent to which the field lines wrap and coil around one another.

Magnetic helicity
Magnetic helicity  is the helicity of a magnetic vector potential  where  is the associated magnetic field confined to a volume . Magnetic helicity can then be expressed as
 

Since the magnetic vector potential is not gauge invariant, the magnetic helicity is also not gauge invariant in general. As a consequence, the magnetic helicity of a physical system cannot be measured directly. In certain conditions and under certain assumptions, one can however measure the current helicity of a system and from it, when further conditions are fulfilled and under further assumptions, deduce the magnetic helicity.

Magnetic helicity has units of magnetic flux squared: Wb2 (webers squared) in SI units and Mx2 (maxwells squared) in Gaussian Units.

Current helicity
The current helicity, or helicity  of the magnetic field  confined to a volume , can be expressed as
 
where  is the current density. Unlike magnetic helicity, current helicity is not an ideal invariant (it is not conserved even when the electrical resistivity is zero).

Topological interpretation 

The name "helicity" relies on the fact that the trajectory of a fluid particle in a fluid with velocity  and vorticity  forms a helix in regions where the kinetic helicity .  When , the helix is right-handed and when  it is left-handed. This behaviour is very similar to magnetic field lines.

Regions where magnetic helicity is not zero can also contain other sorts of magnetic structures as helical magnetic field lines. Magnetic helicity is indeed a generalization of the topological concept of linking number to the differential quantities required to describe the magnetic field. The linking number describes how many magnetic field lines are interlinked (see  for a mathematical proof of it). Through a simple experiment with paper and scissors, one can show that magnetic field lines which turn around each other can be considered as being interlinked (figure 5 in ). Thus, the presence of magnetic helicity can be interpreted as helical magnetic field lines, interlinked magnetic structures, but also magnetic field lines turning around each other.

Magnetic field lines turning around each other can take several shapes. Let's consider for example a set of turning magnetic field lines in a close neighborhood, which forms a so-called "magnetic flux tube" (see figure for an illustration).

"Twist" means that the flux tube rotates around its own axis (figures with Twist=). Topologically speaking, units of twist and of writhe (which means, the rotation of the flux tube axis itself — figures with Writhe=) can be transformed into each other. One can also show that knots are also equivalent to units of twist and/or writhe.

As with many quantities in electromagnetism, magnetic helicity (which describes magnetic field lines) is closely related to fluid mechanical helicity (which describes fluid flow lines) and their dynamics are interlinked.

Ideal quadratic invariance 
In the late 1950s, Lodewijk Woltjer and Walter M. Elsässer discovered independently the ideal invariance of magnetic helicity, that is, its conservation when resistivity is zero. Woltjer's proof, valid for a closed system, is repeated in the following:

In ideal magnetohydrodynamics, the time evolution of a magnetic field and magnetic vector potential can be expressed using the induction equation as
 
respectively, where  is a scalar potential given by the gauge condition (see ). Choosing the gauge so that the scalar potential vanishes, the time evolution of magnetic helicity in a volume  is given by:
 
The dot product in the integrand of the first term is zero since  is orthogonal to the cross product , and the second term can be integrated by parts to give
 
where the second term is a surface integral over the boundary surface  of the closed system. The dot product in the integrand of the first term is zero because  is orthogonal to  The second term also vanishes because motions inside the closed system cannot affect the vector potential outside, so that at the boundary surface  since the magnetic vector potential is a continuous function. Therefore,
 
and magnetic helicity is ideally conserved. In all situations where magnetic helicity is gauge invariant, magnetic helicity is ideally conserved without the need of the specific gauge choice 

Magnetic helicity remains conserved in a good approximation even with a small but finite resistivity, in which case magnetic reconnection dissipates energy.

Inverse transfer property 

Small-scale helical structures tend to form larger and larger magnetic structures. This can be called an inverse transfer in Fourier space, as opposed to the (direct) energy cascade in threedimensional turbulent hydrodynamical flows. The possibility of such an inverse transfer has first been proposed by Uriel Frisch and collaborators and has been verified through many numerical experiments. As a consequence, the presence of magnetic helicity is a possibility to explain the existence and sustainment of large-scale magnetic structures in the Universe.

The "realizability condition" corresponds to an application of Cauchy-Schwarz inequality, which yields:

with  the magnetic energy spectrum. To obtain this inequality, the fact that  (with  the solenoidal part of the Fourier transformed magnetic vector potential, orthogonal to the wavevector in Fourier space) has been used, since .

Assuming that all the energy and magnetic helicity transfers are done to another wavevector , the conservation of magnetic helicity on the one hand and of the total energy  (the sum of (m)agnetic and (k)inetic energy) on the other hand gives:

The second equality for the energy comes from the fact that we consider an initial state with no kinetic energy. Then we have necessarily . Indeed, if we would have , then:

which would break the realizability condition. This means that .

Gauge considerations 
Magnetic helicity is a gauge-dependent quantity, because  can be redefined by adding a gradient to it (gauge choosing). However, for perfectly conducting boundaries or periodic systems without a net magnetic flux, the magnetic helicity contained in the whole domain is gauge invariant, that is, independent of the gauge choice. A gauge-invariant relative helicity has been defined for volumes with non-zero magnetic flux on their boundary surfaces.

See also 

 Woltjer's theorem

References

External links 

 A. A. Pevtsov's Helicity Page
 Mitch Berger's Publications Page

Physical quantities
Plasma physics
Astrophysics